Tristan Connelly (born December 12, 1985) is a Canadian mixed martial arts fighter who formerly competed in the featherweight division of the UFC and had previously won the Cage Sports Lightweight Championship, Unified MMA Lightweight Championship, as well as the Rise FC Lightweight Championship.

Background
Born and raised in Victoria, British Columbia, Connelly began competing in mixed martial arts in 2010. , he holds a black belt in Brazilian jiu-jitsu under Adam Ryan. Connelly runs a gym, called Pinnacle Combat Academy, in suburban Richmond.

Connelly spent much of his childhood skateboarding and playing hockey, which he credits with preparing him to take hard hits. After taking a BJJ class, Connelly fell in love with the sport and the wider world of mixed martial arts.

Mixed martial arts career

Early career
Connelly competed in smaller promotions, earning himself a record of 13–6. During that span, he managed to capture lightweight championships in three different promotions: Rise FC, CageSport, Unifed MMA.

Ultimate Fighting Championship
Replacing Sergey Khandozhko on 5 days notice, Connelly made his promotional debut on September 14, 2019, against Michel Pereira at UFC Fight Night 158. At the weigh-ins, Pereira missed weight by a pound and forfeited 20 percent of his purse to Connelly. Despite a flashy start from Pereira he quickly gassed allowing Connelly to dominate the remainder of the fight and winning via unanimous decision. The bout was awarded a Fight of the Night bonus, but due to Pereira's weight miss, his bonus was forfeited to Connelly.

Connelly was scheduled to make his sophomore appearance in the organization against Alex da Silva Coelho on April 11, 2020, at UFC Fight Night: Overeem vs. Harris. However, the event was initially rescheduled and eventually cancelled due to the COVID-19 pandemic and the bout was scrapped.

Connelly spent the next year on the sidelines recovering from a disc injury in his neck that he acquired in a car crash in 2019 before his UFC debut.

In his sophomore appearance in the UFC, Connelly faced Pat Sabatini at UFC 261 on April 24, 2021. He lost the fight via unanimous decision after being knocked down early in the fight.

Connelly was then scheduled to face Makwan Amirkhani on October 30, 2021 at UFC 267. However, Connelly withdrew in early September due to a neck injury and was replaced by Lerone Murphy.

Connelly faced Darren Elkins on April 30, 2022 at UFC on ESPN: Font vs. Vera. He lost the bout via unanimous decision.

On June 9, 2022 it was announced that Connelly was released from the UFC.

Post UFC 
Connelly faced Xavier Nash on October 12, 2022 at BFL 74. He lost the bout via unanimous decision.

Championships and accomplishments
Ultimate Fighting Championship
Fight of the Night (One Time) vs. Michel Pereira
Rise Fighting Championship
Rise FC Lightweight Championship (one time; former)
CageSport MMA
CS Lightweight Championship (one time; former)
One successful title defense
Unified MMA
Unified MMA Lightweight Championship (one time; former)
MMAjunkie.com
2019 Upset of the Year vs. Michel Pereira
Sherdog
2019 Upset of the Year vs. Michel Pereira

Mixed martial arts record

|-
|Loss
|align=center|14–9
|Xavier Nash
|Decision (unanimous)
|BFL 74
|
|align=center|3
|align=center|5:00
|Vancouver, Canada
|
|-
|Loss
|align=center|14–8
|Darren Elkins
|Decision (unanimous)
|UFC on ESPN: Font vs. Vera
|
|align=center|3
|align=center|5:00
|Las Vegas, Nevada, United States
|
|-
| Loss
| align=center|14–7
| Pat Sabatini
| Decision (unanimous)
| UFC 261
| 
| align=center|3
| align=center|5:00
| Jacksonville, Florida, United States
| 
|-
| Win
| align=center|14–6
| Michel Pereira
|Decision (unanimous)
|UFC Fight Night: Cowboy vs. Gaethje 
|
|align=center|3
|align=center|5:00
|Vancouver, British Columbia, Canada
| 
|-
| Win
| align=center|13–6
| D'Juan Owens
| TKO (punches)
| Rise FC 4 
| 
| align=center|5
| align=center|1:56
| : Victoria, British Columbia, Canada
| 
|-
| Win
| align=center|12–6
| Zach Juusola
| Submission (guillotine)
| Final Fight Championship 36
| 
| align=center|1
| align=center|2:46
| Las Vegas, Nevada, United States
| 
|-
| Win
| align=center|11–6
| Tyrone Henderson
| TKO (Retirement)
| CageSport 54
| 
| align=center|1
| align=center|5:00
| Tacoma, Washington, United States
| 
|-
| Win
| align=center| 10–6
| Joey Pierotti
| Submission (armbar)
| CageSport 50
| 
| align=center| 4
| align=center| 1:06
| Tacoma, Washington, United States
| 
|-
| Loss
| align=center| 9–6
| Shane Campbell
| Submission (kneebar)
| Unified MMA 31 
| 
| align=center| 3
| align=center| 4:54
| Edmonton, Alberta, Canada
|
|-
| Win
| align=center|9–5
| Lenny Wheeler
| Submission  (rear naked choke)
| Elite 1 MMA
| 
| align=center| 3
| align=center| 3:47
| Fredericton, New Brunswick, Canada
|
|-
| Win
| align=center| 8–5
| Garret Nybakken
| Submission (rear naked choke)
| Unified MMA 30
| 
| align=center| 3
| align=center| 2:47
| Edmonton, Alberta, Canada
| 
|-
| Win
| align=center| 7–5
| Adam Assenza
| Submission (rear naked choke)
| Fight Night 2
| 
| align=center| 2
| align=center| 1:11
| Medicine Hat, Alberta, Canada
|
|-
| Win
| align=center| 6–5
| Ash Mashreghi
| TKO (punches)
| BFL 45 Ascension
| 
| align=center| 1
| align=center| 1:24
| Coquitlam, British Columbia, Canada
| 
|-
| Loss
| align=center| 5–5
| Mario Pereira
| Decision (unanimous)
| BFL 39: Halloween Hell
| 
| align=center| 3
| align=center| 5:00
| Coquitlam, British Columbia, Canada
| 
|-
| Win
| align=center| 5–4
| Shawn Albrecht
| TKO (punches)
| BFL 37: Gladiator
| 
| align=center| 1
| align=center| 4:21
| Coquitlam, British Columbia, Canada
| 
|-
| Win
| align=center| 4–4
| Jonathan Dubois
| Submission (rear naked choke)
| AFC 18: Mayhem
| 
| align=center| 1
| align=center| 2:48
| Victoria, British Columbia, Canada
| 
|-
| Loss
| align=center| 3–4
| Myles Merola
| Decision (unanimous)
| AFC 13: Natural Selection
| 
| align=center| 3
| align=center| 5:00
| Victoria, British Columbia, Canada
| 
|-
| Win
| align=center| 3–3
| Corey Houston
| Submission (rear naked choke)
| AFC 11: Takeover
| 
| align=center| 1
| align=center| 4:47
| Winnipeg, Manitoba, Canada
| 
|-
| Loss
| align=center| 2–3
| Matt Trudeau
| TKO (shoulder injury)
| Armageddon FC 7
| 
| align=center| 1
| align=center| 5:00
| Colwood, British Columbia, Canada
| 
|-
| Win
| align=center| 2–2
| Upneet Rai
| Submission (rear naked choke)
| Armageddon FC 6
| 
| align=center| 1
| align=center| 2:30
| Colwood, British Columbia, Canada
| 
|-
| Loss
| align=center| 1–2
| Dan Ring
| Decision (unanimous)
| Armageddon FC 4
| 
| align=center| 3
| align=center| 5:00
| Halifax, Nova Scotia, Canada
| 
|-
| Loss
| align=center| 1–1
| Takahiro Kajita
| Decision (unanimous)
| Deep: Cage Impact in Nagoya
| 
| align=center| 2
| align=center| 5:00
| Nagoya, Japan
| 
|-
| Win
| align=center| 1-0
| Jimmy Phan
| Submission (rear naked choke)
| Armageddon FC
| 
| align=center| 1
| align=center| 2:26
| Colwood, British Columbia, Canada
|

See also
List of Canadian UFC fighters

References

External links
 
 

Canadian male mixed martial artists
Living people
Sportspeople from British Columbia
1985 births
Ultimate Fighting Championship male fighters
Lightweight mixed martial artists
Mixed martial artists utilizing collegiate wrestling
Mixed martial artists utilizing Brazilian jiu-jitsu
Canadian male sport wrestlers
Amateur wrestlers
Canadian practitioners of Brazilian jiu-jitsu
People awarded a black belt in Brazilian jiu-jitsu